Alexandra Bech Gjørv (born 13 September 1965) is a Norwegian lawyer and businesswoman.

She is the daughter of journalist Toppen Bech, and a daughter-in-law of politician Inger Lise Gjørv. She was assigned with Norsk Hydro from 1993 to 2007, and with Statoil from 2007 to 2010. She chaired the governmental commission appointed after the 2011 Norway attacks, which presented their findings in the Gjørv Report. In 2015 she became the chief executive of SINTEF.

Gjørv graduated as cand.jur. in 1990 from the University of Oslo, received further education at the University of Oxford (1991) and the Suffolk University in Boston (1993), and passed the New York State Bar Exam in 1994.

References

1965 births
Living people
Norwegian women lawyers
Norwegian businesspeople
Place of birth missing (living people)
People educated at Atlantic College
20th-century Norwegian lawyers